The People's Alliance or simply [The] People is an electoral alliance in Turkey, established in February 2018 between the ruling Justice and Development Party (AK Party) and the formerly opposition Nationalist Movement Party (MHP). The alliance was formed to contest the 2018 general election, and brings together the political parties supporting the re-election of President Recep Tayyip Erdoğan. Its main rival is the Nation Alliance, which was originally created by four opposition parties in 2018 and was re-established in 2019.

History

Background
After the fail of the 2013-2015 PKK-Turkey peace process, the Justice and Development Party (AK Party) and the Nationalist Movement Party (MHP) closed ideologically each other against PKK. With the support of MHP votes in the Grand National Assembly, President Recep Tayyip Erdoğan succeeded on passing the constitutional referendum in April 2017, which turned Turkey into a presidential system and would expand the executive power of the President of Turkey. Members of the MHP dissidents formed a new party, the new formed of the moderate conservative nationalist Good Party.

Since the new party formed, both AK Party and MHP fear to lose votes to a new nationalist party formed by former MHP members. As a result, the two parties have agreed to form a coalition.

Formation
The alliance has a joint presidential candidate, incumbent President Recep Tayyip Erdoğan. Each party is expected to nominate candidates for parliament separately.

On 23 October 2018, after a series of public disagreements between the AK Party and MHP, the MHP leader Devlet Bahçeli formally announced that his party would no longer seek to field joint candidates in prominent areas in the forthcoming March 2019 local elections. In response, Erdoğan stressed that the two parties were fundamentally different, and must go their separate ways on issues they disagreed on.

Public disagreements focussed on a general pardon for pro-MHP prisoners, as well as a court decision to annul the abolition of the Student Oath. The oath had been abolished during the Solution process by the AK Party government in an attempt to appease Kurdistan Worker's Party (PKK) rebels, who regard its recital as racist. The court's decision to re-establish it was strongly supported by the MHP, while opposed by the AK Party.

However, both parties have stressed that they do not regard this as a dissolution of the alliance in the Turkish parliament and that the suspension of the electoral alliance for the local elections is only temporary.

On March 9 2023, the pro-Erdoğan journalist Mahmut Övür declared that Democratic Left Party will join the People's Alliance for the 2023 Turkish general election.

On March 11 2023, HÜDA PAR leader Zekeriya Yapıcıoğlu announced that it would support the People's Alliance for the 2023 Turkish general election, also stating that it would continue its talks with the Alliance for the 2023 Turkish parliamentary election.

Composition

Founding members

Additional members

After the formation of the alliance, there was speculation in the Turkish media, as well as among prominent analysts and politicians, that other minor parties could join it before the 24 June 2018 elections. The parties most commonly mentioned as potential future members were the Great Unity Party (BBP) and the Felicity Party (SP). While the SP ruled out joining the alliance, the BBP entered talks to join. In early May 2018, the BBP ultimately joined the alliance on the lists of the AKP, while the Felicity Party instead aligned with the opposition Nation alliance led by the Republican People's Party.

Supporting parties

On 14 May, the Motherland Party (ANAP) announced that it would support the People's Alliance, on the basis of the political ideology of their founder, Turgut Özal. ANAP had supported 'No' in the 2017 constitutional referendum, as opposed to all other parties within the Alliance that had said 'Yes'.

On 18 May 2018, the AS Party (ASP) announced its support for the People's Alliance.

On 20 December 2019, it was reported the Patriotic Party (VP) favoured the People's Alliance.

The Free Cause Party (HÜDA PAR) supported the Alliance in the 2018 Turkish presidential election while contesting the 2018 Turkish parliamentary election as a stand-alone party. The party announced that they will support the alliance in the 2023 Turkish presidential election.

Notes

References

2018 establishments in Turkey
Justice and Development Party (Turkey)
Nationalist Movement Party
Political parties established in 2018
Political party alliances in Turkey
Right-wing politics in Turkey
Far-right political parties in Turkey
Eurosceptic parties in Turkey
National conservative parties
Social conservative parties
Turkish nationalist organizations
Nationalist parties in Turkey
Right-wing populist parties
Right-wing populism in Turkey
Right-wing parties in Europe